Chitron mniszechi is a species of beetle in the family Cerambycidae, and the only species in the genus Chitron. It was described by Buquet in 1859.

References

Onciderini
Beetles described in 1859